Sir Thomas Etton (Thomas de Etton), of Gilling, Yorkshire was a 14th-15th century English noble. He died in 1402.

Life
Thomas was the son and heir of Thomas Etton of Gilling and Elizabeth Fairfax. Thomas was present during the Battle of Nájera, La Rioja, Castile on 3 April 1367 and his name appears in letters of protection during John of Gaunt, Duke of Lancaster's campaign in the Pays de Caux region in Normandy in 1369.

Marriage and issue
Thomas Etton, married Isabel, sister and heiress of John Dayveil, and widow of Richard Wilsthorp. They are known to have had the following issue:
John Etton (d. 1433), married firstly Katherine Everingham and secondly Elizabeth Pigot, had issue.
George 
William
Richard
Katherine
Elizabeth

Citations

References

Year of birth unknown
14th-century births
1402 deaths
14th-century English people
15th-century English people
People from Ryedale (district)